The 2018 Mobile Mini Sun Cup was the eighth edition of the preseason exhibition soccer tournament and the first under its new name and sponsor. It was held from February 3 to February 24 in Tucson and Phoenix, Arizona. The defending champions were the Houston Dynamo.

Teams 
The following clubs entered the tournament:

Major League Soccer
Colorado Rapids (fifth appearance)
FC Dallas (first appearance)
Houston Dynamo (third appearance)
New England Revolution (seventh appearance)
New York Red Bulls (fifth appearance)
Portland Timbers (first appearance)
Seattle Sounders FC (third appearance)
Sporting Kansas City (fifth appearance)

United Soccer League
San Antonio FC (first appearance)
Phoenix Rising FC (second appearance)

Table standings

Matches

Finals

References 

2018
2018 in American soccer
2018 in sports in Arizona
February 2018 sports events in the United States